My Unfamiliar Family is a 2020 South Korean television series starring Jung Jin-young, Won Mi-kyung, Choo Ja-hyun, Han Ye-ri, Shin Jae-ha and Kim Ji-seok. It aired on tvN from June 1 to July 21, 2020.

Cast

Main
 Jung Jin-young as Kim Sang-shik
 Han Joon-woo as young Sang-shik
 Won Mi-kyung as Lee Jin-sook
 Ah Young as young Jin-sook
 Choo Ja-hyun as Kim Eun-joo
 Han Ye-ri as Kim Eun-hee
 Shin Jae-ha as Kim Ji-woo
 Kim Ji-seok as Park Chan-hyuk

Supporting
 Park Sang-myun as Man-ho
 Jo Wan-gi as Young-shik
 Seo Sang-won as Yoo Sun-il
 Lee Ji-ha as Oh Mi-sook
 Kim Tae-hoon as Yoon Tae-hyung
 Lee Jong-won as Ahn Hyo-seok
 Bae Yoon-kyung as So-young
 Han Joon-woo as Kim Sang-shik 
 Shin Dong-wook as Im Gun-joo
 Ga Deuk-hee as Seo Kyung-ok
 Shin Hye-jeong as Yoon Seo-young

Special appearances
 Kim Soo-jin as book author (Ep. 1 & 3)
 Choi Woong as Lee Jong-min (Ep. 1 & 7)
 Han Ji-wan as Hye-soo (Ep. 1)
 Park Hee-von as Ri-ra (Ep. 9)
 Oh Eui-shik as Woo-seok (Ep. 9)
 Baek Hyun-joo as Mr. Yoo's wife (Ep. 9)
 Woo Mi-hwa as Yoon Seo-young's mother (Ep. 3)

Original soundtrack

Part 1

Part 2

Part 3

Viewership

Awards and nominations

References

External links
  
 
 

TVN (South Korean TV channel) television dramas
Korean-language television shows
2020 South Korean television series debuts
2020 South Korean television series endings
Television series by Studio Dragon